Liam Stevenson is a Scottish campaigner who founded the Time for Inclusive Education (TIE) campaigning group and charity. His work focuses on homophobia in schools and LGBT education.

Background
Stevenson organised public meetings during the Scottish independence referendum in 2014. He later became involved in LGBT activism.

TIE Activism
Stevenson and Jordan Daly founded Time for Inclusive Education (known as the TIE Campaign) in June 2015. The pair are credited with winning gains for the LGBT community in relation to education, including achieving the support of the Scottish Parliament for their cause as well as the creation of a Scottish Government LGBT education working group of which both are currently members. In 2018 the group proposed policy recommendations to the Scottish Government, all of which were accepted, making Scotland the first country in the world to include LGBT themes in the curriculum for all public schools. Stevenson and Daly publicly stated that their campaigning efforts had been successful.

References

Living people
Scottish activists
Scottish LGBT rights activists
Year of birth missing (living people)